Triacetic acid lactone (TAL; 4-hydroxy-6-methyl-2-pyrone) is an organic compound derived enzymatically from glucose. It is a light yellow solid that is soluble in organic solvents.

Structure
Triacetic acid lactone consists of two main tautomers.

The tautomer on the left, featuring a 4-hydroxy group, the C4 carbon, is dominant. Triacetic acid lactone is classified as a 2-pyrone compound owing to the ketone group on the C2 carbon in its dominant form.

Synthesis 
Triacetic acid lactone is synthesized either from dehydroacetic acid, another 2-pyrone derivative, or from glucose by enzymatic catalysis. In its original synthesis, triacetic acid lactone was obtained by treatment of dehydroacetic acid with sulfuric acid at 135 °C. Dehydroacetic acid undergoes ring-opening and hydration to form "tetracetic acid". Upon cooling, triacetic acid reverts to a lactone ring similar to the dehydroacetic acid structure, and the triacetic acid lactone is recovered by crystallization in cold water.

Biosynthesis 
The microbial synthesis of triacetic acid lactone requires the enzyme 2-pyrone synthase (2-PS). This enzyme has been examined in two hosts Escherichia coli and Saccharomyces cerevisiae.  The Saccharomyces cerevisiae host being used during the synthesis produces a higher yield (70%) compared with the Escherichia coli host, which produces a yield of 40% of triacetic acid lactone. This enzyme catalyzes the synthesis of triacetic acid lactone from acetyl-CoA via two subsequent condensations with malonyl-CoA. This produces an intermediate of 3,5-diketohexanoate thioester, which undergoes ring closure to produce triacetic acid lactone.

Reactivity 
The lactone is a versatile intermediate in organic synthesis. It has also been described as a platform chemical, meaning that it could be the precursor to other fine chemicals.  The lactone undergoes decarboxylation to acetylacetone.  It is also a precursor to sorbic acid, dienoic acid, and hexenoic acid. Dienoic acid is used to inhibit the growth of various molds and hexenoic acid is used as a flavoring agent. Acetylacetone is used for metal extraction and plating and as a food additive.

References

2-Pyrones
Phenols